The 1990 Maui Invitational Tournament was an early-season college basketball tournament that was played, for the 7th time, from November 23 to November 25, 1990. The tournament, which began in 1984, was part of the 1990-91 NCAA Division I men's basketball season.  The tournament was played at the Lahaina Civic Center in Maui, Hawaiiand was won by the Syracuse Orange. It was the first title for the program and its head coach Jim Boeheim.

Bracket

References

Maui Invitational Tournament
Maui Invitational